The Merri Creek is a waterway in southern parts of  Victoria, Australia, which flows through the northern suburbs of Northcote. It begins near Wallan north of Melbourne and flows south for 70 km until it joins the Yarra River at Dights Falls. The area where the creek meets the river was traditionally the location for large gatherings of the Wurundjeri people and is suspected to have been the location for one of the earliest land treaties in Australia between Indigenous Australians and European settlers.

The creek was the site of heavy industrial use throughout much of the 20th century, being home to quarries, landfills and accepting waste runoff from neighbouring factories. This has degraded the riparian ecology of the creek leaving behind pollutants such as heavy metals and various greases. Recent decades have seen some regenerative planting and the foundation of several community groups dedicated to protecting and regenerating the creek's ecology.

Etymology
The unnamed creek in the 1800s described by John Batman as a “lovely stream of water” appeared as Merri Merri Creek in an early 1839 map. It was shortened later to Merri Creek. 

The phrase said to be Woi-worung language was not documented anywhere else by observers and is disputed by historians and Elders in People of the Merri Merri. 

Some believe it means “very rocky” or “very stony” to symbolise the volcanic history of the site.

Geography

Over 400 million years ago the sea covering the area receded. It left behind a layer of yellowish marine siltstone and sandstone rocks. Around 66 million years ago non-marine sediments left a sandy layer behind. Over time the ancestral valley of the Merri Creek developed, eroding through these sediments. Then, from 4.6 to 0.8 million years ago volcanoes such as Hayes Hill (about 5 km east of Donnybrook) and Mount Fraser (near Beveridge) erupted, sending lava on a journey along the ancestral valleys of the Merri and Darebin Creeks and into the valley of the Yarra River as far as the CBD.

The modern day Merri Creek was formed over many years, by incising through the lava surface. Today, the creek begins in Wallan north of Melbourne and flows in a southerly direction for 70 km until it joins the Yarra River in Fairfield near Dights Falls and subsequently flows into Port Phillip Bay. Its tributaries include; Wallan Creek, Mittagong Creek, Taylors Creek, Malcolm Creek, Aitken Creek, Curly Sedge Creek, Merlynston Creek and Edgars Creek. It flows through, or forms a part of the borders between the suburbs of Wallan, Kalkallo, Donnybrook, Craigieburn, Wollert, Epping, Somerton, Campbellfield, Lalor, Thomastown, Fawkner, Reservoir, Coburg North, Coburg, Preston, Thornbury,  Brunswick East, Northcote, Westgarth, Fitzroy North, Clifton Hill and Fairfield before meeting the Yarra River just upstream of Dights Falls.

Rocky cliff face
One of the many sites of geological interest
along the Merri valley is the rocky cliff face on the eastern side of Merri Creek visible from the shared path in Clifton Hill. Its tall, cracked (or jointed) basalt columns, formed by cooling lava, are clearly visible and the weathering evident in the rocky riffles midstream where columns have collapsed and tumbled into the stream. Some of the vertical fractures at the top of the cliff appear to be leaning, forming a striking radial pattern.

Flora and fauna

As native vegetation has been regenerated, some species of native wildlife has returned to the creek including Kookaburras, Kingfishers, Yellow-tailed Black Cockatoos, Echidnas, frogs and reports of platypuses in the upper northern regions and now further south in Coburg. Merri Creek is abundant in edible plants for those trained to identify them.  Edible species include dandelion, dock, fennel, jerusalem artichoke, numerous brassicas, blackberry nightshade, sorrel, catsear, sowthistle, nettle and many others.  Great care in identification should be taken when harvesting fennel and other members of the family Apiaceae, as Poison hemlock has been found growing in some areas of the creek.

History
The large number of pre and post-contact archaeological sites demonstrate a heavy usage of the area by Indigenous Australians. The creek and surrounding valley was the site of many large gatherings of Aboriginal people and is suspected to be the site of one of the earliest land treaties between Aboriginals and Europeans.

Archaeology
Many archaeological sites found contain scattered stone artefacts from old campsites, and scarred trees from which traditional people removed slabs of bark to make canoes, containers and shields. The artefact scatters are found because erosion of some sort has exposed the implements which were covered with sediment. The scarred trees are often on the creek bank, fence line or road reserve where they escaped the clearance process. Both site types exhibit traces of the hunting and gathering lifestyle of pre-contact Victoria, and are a fragile and non-renewable historical resource. Aboriginal sites are protected under the Aboriginal Heritage Act 2006.

Pre-European

The Wurundjeri-willam were the original occupants of what are now the northern suburbs of Melbourne. Their name comes from the Aboriginal word Wurrun meaning "white gum tree". The Wurundjeri-willam was a clan consisting of a number of extended families. During the first years of contact with Europeans, the Wurundjeri-willam people were represented by influential senior men such as Billibellary, a respected elder. Billibellary’s clan lived on the northern bank of the Yarra and their territory extended from Yarra Bend northwards along the Merri Creek.

The creek supplied the Wurundjeri-willam with an abundance of food such as eel, fish, and duck. Women waded through the Merri with string bags suspended around their neck, searching the bottom of the stream for shellfish. Emu and kangaroo were hunted in the surrounding grasslands. In the forests and hills, possum was also a staple source of food and clothing, The flesh of the possum was cooked and eaten, while the skin was saved to be sewn into valuable waterproof cloaks.

Post-European

In May 1835 an historic meeting took place between John Batman and prominent members of the Wurundjeri-willam and other clans. 
Billibellary and the other clan elders signed a document, which came to be called Batman's Treaty, the only treaty ever struck between the European settlers and the indigenous people of Australia. These unique negotiations took place, wrote Batman, by the banks of a "lovely stream of water" which twentieth century historians suspect to be the Merri Creek. This treaty was declared invalid by Sir Richard Bourke, the Governor of N.S.W., who was unwilling to recognize and allow the aborigines the right to use and control their own land as they saw fit, thus implementing the doctrine of terra nullius.

The largest recorded meeting of Aboriginal people in Victoria occurred at Merri Creek in January 1844. The Wurundjeri-willam hosted an immense gathering of tribes which came from all over central Victoria. An estimated 800 people journeyed to the district to witness important judicial proceedings carried out according to traditions of Aboriginal law.

Since European settlement, the lower reaches of the creek have been seriously degraded by human activity. In the early history of Melbourne, numerous quarries were established along the creek to extract bluestone for the construction of many of the city's buildings and paving for roads and lanes. These quarries were later used as landfill for waste. Numerous environmental weeds, such as prickly pear and weeping willows, invaded the banks and stormwater from suburban streets drains directly into the creek bringing rubbish and other pollutants.

Pollution

In recent decades much has been done to remedy the creek's condition. Patches of remnant native flora still remain along the creek, and through weed control and ecological burning their quality has been improved.  Much native vegetation has been replanted by the Merri Creek Management Committee and the volunteer group Friends of Merri Creek. In recent years, Melbourne Water has been involved in a willow control program to improve water flows and allow for the revegetation of sites with indigenous plant species. At times of low flow, water is sustained in the creek through treated outfall from the Craigieburn sewage treatment plant, . Water quality was thought to have been insufficient to allow repopulation by platypus. This is thought to be because toxicants in sediments in the creek have reduced macroinvertebrate productivity to the point where there is insufficient food to feed a population of platypus. The toxicants are mainly heavy metals and greases which originated in industrial areas in the catchment. However the first sighting in decades occurred between Thornbury and Coburg in Sept 2010.

Parks and recreation
Parks Victoria manages a bit of the established parklands on the banks of the river, facilities include football & cricket ovals, tennis courts and playgrounds. The Merri Creek Trail shared pathway has been established along the banks to take advantage of the improving environment, but the path is broken at Westgarth and North Fitzroy, necessitating traversing St George's Road.   Each year, at the CERES Community Environment Park, the Return of the King and Harvest Festivals are celebrated on the banks of the river. The Merri Creek Labyrinth, a circular labyrinth made of stone, is located just off the adjoining trail in Clifton Hill.

Management and protection
Management of the waterways of the Merri Catchment is guided by the Merri Creek and Environs Strategy 2009-2014.  A 2,500-hectare park has been proposed along the banks of the creek to help protect and regenerate the riparian ecosystem.

Gallery

Bridges

References

External links
 Merri Creek Management Committee
 Friends of Merri Creek
 Pre-European History of Merri Creek

Melbourne Water catchment
Rivers of Greater Melbourne (region)
Rivers of Hume (region)
Tributaries of the Yarra River
City of Yarra
City of Merri-bek
City of Darebin
City of Hume
City of Whittlesea